Gjone is a small part of the district Kvelde, which is situated approximately 20 km north of Larvik, Norway. It consists of six main farms. The three original farms, Nord Gjone, Mellem Gjone and Gjone Gård, were further divided into other farms due to the old system of land partition, whereby every son inherited his own portion of the land. Today, approximately forty people live in the Gjone area.{
  "type": "FeatureCollection",
  "features": [
    {
      "type": "Feature",
      "properties": {},
      "geometry": {
        "type": "Point",
        "coordinates": [
          9.983333333333333,
          59.18333333333333
        ]
      }
    }
  ]
}

References 

Villages in Vestfold og Telemark